Hoeneß (or Hoeness) is a German surname. Notable people with the surname include:

 Uli Hoeneß (born 1952), German footballer
 Dieter Hoeneß (born 1953), German footballer, brother of Uli

German-language surnames